Telfer Lamar Mead (March 3, 1888 – June 3, 1983) was an American football and basketball coach and college athletics administrator. He served as the head football coach at Colorado College from 1922 to 1925, Northern Normal and Industrial School—now known as Northern State University—in Aberdeen, South Dakota from 1927 to 1928, and Western State College of Colorado—now known as Western Colorado University—in Gunnison, Colorado from 1930 to 1934, compiling a career college football coaching record of 25–47–6.  He was also the head basketball coach at Colorado College from 1922 to 1926, Northern Normal and Industrial from 1927 to 1929, and Western State from 1930 to 1934, tallying a career college basketball coaching mark of 93–59.

Head coaching record

College football

References

External links
 

1888 births
1983 deaths
Indiana Hoosiers football players
Colorado College Tigers athletic directors
Colorado College Tigers football coaches
Colorado College Tigers men's basketball coaches
Northern State Wolves football coaches
Northern State Wolves men's basketball coaches
Western Colorado Mountaineers football coaches
Western Colorado Mountaineers men's basketball coaches
High school football coaches in Illinois
High school football coaches in Nebraska
People from Kendall County, Illinois
Sportspeople from the Chicago metropolitan area
Coaches of American football from Illinois
Players of American football from Illinois
Basketball coaches from Illinois